Amanda Abbington (born Amanda Jane Smith;  28 February 1974) is an English actress. She is best known for playing Josie Mardle in Mr Selfridge and Mary Morstan in  Sherlock, the BBC adaptation of Arthur Conan Doyle's Sherlock Holmes stories.

Early life
Abbington was born Amanda Jane Smith in North London, England, on 28 February 1974. An only child, she was brought up in Hertfordshire.

Career
She appeared in the TV series The Bill until 2007 playing various characters. During that time she also appeared in the TV series Wycliffe, Casualty, Dream Team, The Sins, Shades, Doc Martin, Coupling, and Teachers. She appeared in the 2005 comedy sketch show Man Stroke Woman and the 2007–2008 comedy After You've Gone with Nicholas Lyndhurst. She has also appeared in recurring series such as Bernard's Watch and Case Histories.

In 2013, she began appearing in the television series Mr Selfridge as Miss Mardle alongside Jeremy Piven and Frances O'Connor. In 2014, Abbington appeared in the third series of Sherlock as Mary Morstan, the wife of John Watson, played by her then real-life partner Martin Freeman. In 2015 she appeared in the BBC TV crime drama series Cuffs. 

On stage Abbington appeared in August 2018 in the role of Annette in God of Carnage at the Theatre Royal, Bath, and in 2019 as the character Anne in Florian Zeller's play The Son at the Kiln Theatre in Kilburn, London which later that year transferred to The Duke of York's Theatre in London's West End.

In 2023 Abbington starred in the four-part Channel 5 television series, Desperate Measures.

Personal life
Abbington was the partner of Martin Freeman, whom she met on the set of the film Men Only in 2000. The couple appeared together on screen in productions such as The Debt, The Robinsons, The Good Night and Sherlock. Abbington and Freeman, who have two children, a son Joe and a daughter Grace, lived in Hertfordshire before their separation in 2016.
 

 Abbington is engaged to escapologist Jonathan Goodwin. She and Goodwin had been social media friends for a decade, but only met after her split from Freeman. Goodwin proposed marriage within 30 minutes of their first meeting, in Vienna.

Filmography

Film

Television

Theatre

Awards and nominations

References

External links

Living people
1974 births
20th-century English actresses
21st-century English actresses
Actresses from London
English television actresses